Poruvazhy Peruviruthy Malanada Temple is a temple dedicated to Duryodhana, is located in Poruvazhy Village of Kunnathur Tehsil in the Kollam district of Kerala, India.

References

Hindu temples in Kollam district